Garry Fenton (born 1 December 1942) is a former Australian rules footballer, who played with Essendon in the Victorian Football League (VFL).

Fenton played most of his football as follower or in defence. He was recruited to Essendon after winning the 1962 Henderson Medal, while playing for Ballarat Football League club Golden Point.

Once his time at Essendon came to an end he returned to Golden Point and played there until 1969. He was captain-coach in the last two years.

References

1942 births
Australian rules footballers from Victoria (Australia)
Essendon Football Club players
Golden Point Football Club players
Golden Point Football Club coaches
Living people
People educated at Geelong College